The 2014 Team Long Track World Championship was the eighth annual FIM Team Long Track World Championship. The final took place on 23 August 2014 in Forssa, Finland.

Results
  Forssa
 23 August 2014

See also
 2014 Individual Long Track World Championship
 2014 Speedway World Cup

References

Team Long Track World Championship